Mark Stone (born May 13, 1992) is a Canadian professional ice hockey right winger and captain of the Vegas Golden Knights of the National Hockey League (NHL). He was selected by the Ottawa Senators in the sixth round, 178th overall, of the 2010 NHL Entry Draft.

Stone tied Johnny Gaudreau to lead all NHL rookies in scoring during the 2014–15 season with 64 points and received a nomination for the Calder Memorial Trophy as the NHL's top rookie. Stone is widely recognized as one of the NHL's premier two-way forwards. During the 2018–19 NHL season, he was traded to Vegas, and subsequently signed a long-term contract with the team.

Playing career

Junior

After a season with the Winnipeg Thrashers of the Manitoba Midget 'AAA' Hockey League, in which he competed in the 2008 Telus Cup, and won top scorer in the tournament, Stone began his major junior career with the Brandon Wheat Kings of the Western Hockey League (WHL) in 2008–09. He recorded 39 points (17 goals and 22 assists) over 56 games, tying for 12th in WHL rookie scoring. During the 2009 playoffs, he added four points (one goal and three assists) over 12 games. The following season began with Stone ranked in the top 50 on several major scouting lists for the upcoming 2010 NHL Entry Draft. Suffering a concussion and thumb injury during the season, he was limited to 28 points (11 goals and 17 assists) over 39 games, hindering his final draft ranking among scouts. Healthy during the playoffs, he competed in all the Wheat Kings' 15 contests, recording a goal and three assists. Although the Wheat Kings were eliminated in the WHL Conference Finals, they advanced to the 2010 Memorial Cup by way of having been chosen as the host team at the beginning of the year. Playing in the semi-final against the Calgary Hitmen, Stone competed opposite his older brother, Michael. The Wheat Kings beat the Hitmen in dramatic fashion to advance to the Memorial Cup Final, which they lost to the Windsor Spitfires; Stone had no points in five tournament games. During the off-season, he was selected in the sixth round, 178th overall, by the Ottawa Senators in the 2010 NHL Entry Draft. Stone was scouted as a power forward with weak skating.

Stone appeared in his first NHL training camp in September 2010 and was returned to junior for the subsequent season. Playing in his third WHL campaign, Stone emerged with 106 points (37 goals and 69 assists) over 71 games, first on his team and third in WHL scoring. His performance earned him a spot on the WHL East First All-Star Team at the end of the year. During the post-season, Stone recorded ten points over six games as the Wheat Kings were eliminated in the first round. Returning to the Senators' training camp for the second year, he was signed to a three-year, entry-level contract before being sent back to the Wheat Kings for the 2011–12 season. Back in junior, Stone was named Brandon's new team captain, replacing Shayne Wiebe, who had turned professional. Cory Clouston, the Senators' head coach from Stone's first training camp with the team, had been fired and became the Wheat Kings' new coach. He praised Stone as an intelligent hockey player and for improving his core strength from the previous year. During the season, he was selected to compete for Team WHL against the Russian under-20 select squad in the 2011 Subway Super Series. He recorded a goal and an assist in one of the contests on November 17, 2011, to be named the player of the game. In December 2011, Stone was chosen as one of 16 nominees for the 54th annual H. L. (Krug) Crawford Memorial Award for sporting excellence in southwestern Manitoba.

Stone concluded his junior career following the 2011–12 season by being named the winner of the Brad Hornung Trophy as the WHL's most sportsmanlike player, after finishing the season as the WHL's second-leading scorer with 123 points and being named an Eastern Conference First Team All-Star.

Professional

Ottawa Senators
On April 20, 2012, the Ottawa Senators announced Stone would be joining the team and would likely make his NHL debut for the Senators on April 21 in Game 5 of their first round playoff series against the New York Rangers. Stone did indeed play, recording an assist on the winning goal scored by Jason Spezza. Stone made his NHL regular season debut nearly one year later, on March 6, 2013, against the Toronto Maple Leafs. He scored his first NHL goal on January 4, 2014, against Carey Price of the Montreal Canadiens. Stone split the 2013–14 season between Ottawa and their American Hockey League (AHL) affiliate, the Binghamton Senators, recording 4 goals and 8 points in 19 NHL games.

Stone made the Senators' opening night line-up for the 2014–15 season and subsequently enjoyed success on the all-rookie "Kid Line" alongside Mike Hoffman and Curtis Lazar. That offensive success resulted in the Senators announcing on November 7, 2014, that Stone would be staying with the NHL club for the remainder of the season. As the season progressed, Stone became one of Ottawa's top-six forwards, scoring 16 goals and 43 points in his first 62 games and receiving mention as a Calder Memorial Trophy candidate as the NHL's top rookie. He led all NHL players in scoring after the 2015 all-star break. Stone ended the 2014–15 season tied for the rookie scoring lead with the Calgary Flames' Johnny Gaudreau, with 64 points (26 goals, 38 assists) in 80 games, along with leading the NHL in takeaways (98). However, on April 15, Stone suffered a fractured wrist from a slash by Montreal player P. K. Subban. Subban was assessed a five-minute major and game misconduct as a result. Despite the injury, Stone appeared in all of the Senators' post-season games against the Canadiens, achieving four assists in six games, although the Senators ultimately lost the series.

On April 23, 2015, Stone was nominated for the Calder Memorial Trophy, though he ultimately finished second in voting to Florida Panthers' defenceman Aaron Ekblad. On June 25, 2015, Stone signed a three-year contract extension with the Senators worth an average annual value of $3.5 million, with former Senators general manager Bryan Murray calling Stone "one of [the team's] better players, if not one of the best".

Stone appeared in most of the Senators' games during the 2015–16 season, scoring 61 points across 75 games. He led the NHL in takeaways for the second-straight season and was one of the best-performing players after the All-Star Game break. On a March 30 game against the Winnipeg Jets, Dustin Byfuglien delivered a devastating bodycheck to Stone that forced Stone to immediately leave the ice for concussion tests. Though Stone returned to the ice later that game, he would not appear in the remaining games of the season.

During the 2016–17 season, Stone would score 54 points across 71 games and led the NHL in takeaways for the third-straight season with 96, surpassing second-placed Nick Schmaltz by 13.

Despite missing much of the 2017–18 season with injuries, Stone had a successful year production-wise with 62 points in 58 games. However, unable to come to terms with the Senators on a new contract, Stone filed for arbitration and was ultimately awarded a one-year extension that would make him an unrestricted free agent the following offseason.

Vegas Golden Knights
At the 2019 trade deadline, after prolonged speculation and after he did not come to terms on a contract extension with the Senators, Stone was traded to the Vegas Golden Knights, along with Tobias Lindberg, in exchange for Erik Brannstrom, Oscar Lindberg and a 2020 second-round pick. On March 8, 2019, he officially signed an eight-year, $76 million contract extension  (including $48 million in signing bonuses) to remain in Vegas. Stone finished the season as the league leader in takeaways with 122. For his excellent two-way play during the regular season, Stone was a finalist for the Frank J. Selke Trophy as the league's best defensive forward on April 17, 2019, along with Patrice Bergeron of the Boston Bruins and the St. Louis Blues' Ryan O'Reilly.

On April 14, 2019, Stone recorded his first career hat-trick to power the Golden Knights to a 6–3 victory against the San Jose Sharks in game three of the 2019 Stanley Cup playoffs. In doing so, Stone became the first Golden Knight player to record a hat-trick in the playoffs.

The Golden Knights were eliminated by the Sharks in seven games in the first round of the aforementioned playoffs, with Stone recording 12 total points from six goals and six assists.

On January 13, 2021, Stone was named the first captain in Vegas Golden Knights history.

International play

Stone was selected to Canada's junior team for the 2012 World Junior Championships, held in Alberta. He began the tournament with a hat-trick and an assist in the first contest, an 8–1 win against Finland, and consequently was named Canada's player of the game. After losing their semi-final against Russia, Canada defeated Finland to win the bronze medal. Finishing the tournament with a team-leading seven goals and ten points, Stone was named one of Canada's three best players, as selected by the coaches.

Stone was named to Team Canada at the 2016 World Championships, which won the gold medal.

On April 29, 2019, Stone was named to the Team Canada roster for the 2019 IIHF World Championship held in Slovakia. On May 10, 2019 he was designated an alternate captain, along with Sean Couturier. He helped Canada progress through to the playoff rounds before losing the final to Finland to finish with the Silver Medal on May 26, 2019. Stone finished the tournament co-leading alongside Anthony Mantha with 14 points in 10 games. He was named the Tournament's Most Valuable Player by the media.

Personal life
Stone was born in Winnipeg, Manitoba, to parents Rob and Jackie. He attended Westwood Collegiate. His older brother, Michael, also plays in the NHL as a defenceman with the Calgary Flames. The two have competed against each other in the WHL as well as in the 2010 Memorial Cup, as Michael played for the Calgary Hitmen. The two played against each other at the NHL level for the first time on January 31, 2015, when the Senators defeated the Arizona Coyotes 7–2.

Career statistics

Regular season and playoffs

International

Awards and honours

References

External links
 

1992 births
Binghamton Senators players
Brandon Wheat Kings players
Canadian ice hockey right wingers
Living people
Ottawa Senators draft picks
Ottawa Senators players
Ice hockey people from Winnipeg
Vegas Golden Knights players